Jerry Slocum (born January 12, 1952) is an American college basketball coach and former head men's basketball coach at Youngstown State University. He graduated from The King's College in Briarcliff Manor, New York in 1975. On March 7, 2017, Slocum announced he was retiring as head coach at Youngstown State. He had a record of 142–232 in 12 years at the school.

Head coaching record

See also
 List of college men's basketball coaches with 600 wins

References

External links
 Youngstown State profile

1952 births
Living people
American men's basketball coaches
College men's basketball head coaches in the United States
Gannon Golden Knights men's basketball coaches
Geneva Golden Tornadoes men's basketball coaches
Nyack Warriors men's basketball  coaches
The King's College (New York City) alumni
Youngstown State Penguins men's basketball coaches
Place of birth missing (living people)